Debtors' Prison Relief Act of 1792 was a United States federal statute enacted into law by the first President of the United States George Washington on May 5, 1792. The Act of Congress established penal regulations and restrictions for persons jailed for property debt, tax evasion, and tax resistance. The indebtedness penalty was governed as a forbidding act for citizens indebted to colonial provinces. The public law granted a sunset provision limiting the term of the federal statute for the colonial domains.

Clauses of the Act

The Second United States Congress drafted public law 2-29 as four sections providing judicial conformity for colonial debtors who had insolvent financial bankrolls.

Chapter XXIX § 1: Gaol Privileges of Confinement and Yards
 Persons imprisoned from any court of the United States, for satisfaction of judgments in any civil actions shall be entitled to like privileges of the yards or limits of the respective gaols as persons confined in such gaols for debt on judgments rendered in the courts of the several states are entitled to, and under the like regulations and restrictions.

Chapter XXIX § 2: Court Proceedings for Debtors
 Any person imprisoned may have the oath or affirmation herein after expressed administered by any judge of the United States, or of the general or supreme court of law of the state in which the debtor is imprisoned, the creditor, his agent or attorney, if either live within one hundred miles of the place of imprisonment, or within the district in which the judgment was rendered, having had at least thirty days previous notice, by a citation served on him, issued by any such judge, to appear at the time therein mentioned, at the said gaol, if he see fit, to show cause why the said oath or affirmation should not be so administered; at which time and place, if no sufficient cause, in the opinion of the judge, be shown or doth from examination appear to the contrary, he may, at the request of the debtor, proceed to administer to him the following oath or affirmation, as the case may be, viz:

Poor Debtors' Oath
"You solemnly swear (or affirm) that you have not estate, real or personal, nor is any to your knowledge holden in trust for you to the amount or value of twenty dollars, nor sufficient to pay the debt for which you are imprisoned."

 Which oath or affirmation being administered, the judge shall certify the same under his hand, to the prison keeper, and shall fix a reasonable allowance for the debtor's support, not exceeding one dollar per week; and if the creditor shall thereafter any week fail to furnish the debtor with such weekly support, by paying or advancing the money to him, or to the prison keeper, for his use, the debtor shall be discharged from his imprisonment on such judgment, and shall not be liable to be imprisoned again for the said debt; but the judgment shall remain good and sufficient in law, and may be satisfied out of any estate which may then or at any time afterwards belong to the debtor.

Chapter XXIX § 3: Penalty for False Statement
 Any person shall falsely take the oath or affirmation aforesaid, such person shall be deemed guilty of perjury, and suffer the pains and penalties in that case provided.

Chapter XXIX § 4: Limitation of Act
 This act shall continue and be in force, for the space of one year from the passing thereof, and from thence to the end of the next session of Congress, and no longer.

Abolishment of Debtors' Imprisonment
In 1839, the 25th United States Congress passed legislation seeking to prohibit confinement for public defaulters. The federal debt relief law was enacted into law by the 8th President of the United States Martin Van Buren on February 28, 1839.  

The United States statute was authored with the stated conditions of the public law:
That no person shall be imprisoned for debt in any State, on process issuing out of a court of the United States, where by the laws of such State, imprisonment for debt has been abolished; and where by the laws of a State, imprisonment for debt shall be allowed, under certain conditions and restrictions, the same conditions and restrictions shall be applicable to the process issuing out of the courts of the United States; and the same proceedings shall be had therein, as are adopted in the courts of such State.
- 25th United States Congress, Public Law 25-35 ~ 5 Stat. 321 (February 28, 1839)

Associated Debtors' Relief Statutes
Chronology of United States federal laws related to judicial relief of domestic debtors.

See also

18th Century Debtors' Prisons

Notable Colonists and Debt Dilemmas

References

Reading Bibliography

Historical Video Archive

External links
 
 
 

1792 in American law
1792 in the United States
2nd United States Congress